The Best of Great White: 1986–1992 is a compilation album released by the American hard rock band Great White in 1993.

Track listing

Certifications

References 

1993 greatest hits albums
Great White compilation albums
Capitol Records compilation albums